Zvonimir Koceić (8 June 1917 – 16 January 1997), nicknamed Zvonko, was a Croatian footballer who played as a forward and made two appearances for the Croatia national team.

International career
Koceić made his international debut for Croatia on 1 November 1942 in a friendly match against Germany, which finished as a 1–5 loss in Stuttgart. He earned his second and final cap on 6 June 1943 in a friendly against Slovakia, which finished as a 3–1 win in Bratislava. He played both games under the flag of the Independent State of Croatia, a World War II-era puppet state of Nazi Germany.

Personal life
Koceić died on 16 January 1997 at the age of 79.

Career statistics

International

References

External links
 

1917 births
1997 deaths
People from Split-Dalmatia County
Association football forwards
Yugoslav footballers
Croatian footballers
Croatia international footballers
HNK Hajduk Split players
HNK Šibenik players
HAŠK players
Yugoslav First League players